Omar Hammayil (born 1976/77) is the mayor of Al-Bireh (in the West Bank) in the State of Palestine.

He is also a chemistry teacher.

External links
Article

Mayors of Al-Bireh
Palestinian schoolteachers
1970s births
Living people
Year of birth uncertain
Place of birth missing (living people)
People from Al-Bireh
21st-century Palestinian people